Pelgulinn (Estonian for "Refuge Town") is a subdistrict of Põhja-Tallinn (North Tallinn) in Tallinn, the capital of Estonia. Pelgulinn borders Kalamaja to the east, Kelmiküla to the southeast, Lilleküla to the south, Merimetsa to the west, Pelguranna to the northwest, and Karjamaa to the north. Subdistrict has a population of 15,949.

In the 18th century the area was largely covered by meadows and forests. It was used by criminals and outlaws as a hiding place, hence the name Pelgulinn which refers to a hiding place. Pelgulinn started as a slum inhabited by the workers of Tallinn–Saint Petersburg railway in the end of the 19th century.

Gallery

References

External links

Pelgulinna Rahvamaja (Pelgulinn civic house) 
Pelgulinna Majaomanike Selts (Pelgulinn houseowners' association) 

Subdistricts of Tallinn